Madhoo Shah (Madhubala) (born Padma Malini; 26 March 1969) is an Indian actress known for her works predominantly in Hindi, Tamil, Telugu, Malayalam and Kannada language films. She was a part of Movies like Phool Aur Kaante (1991),  Roja (1992), Allari Priyudu (1992),  Yodha (1992), and S. Shankar's Tamil hit Gentleman (1993).

Early life and family
Madhoo is a Tamilian. Her birth name was Padma Malini but her father changed her name to Madhu Malini when she entered school. She was educated at St. Joseph's High School, Juhu and at University of Mumbai. She is the cousin of actress Hema Malini and therefore the aunt of Esha Deol.

Career
Madhoo was signed on by action director Veeru Devgan for his son Ajay Devgan's debut in Phool Aur Kaante (1991), but her first release was K. Balachander' s Azhagan (1991), co-starring Mammooty, Bhanupriya and Geetha. She made her Hindi movie debut with another newcomer Ajay Devgn in Phool Aur Kaante (1991). She made her debut in the Malayalam film Ottayal Pattalam (1991), opposite Mukesh. The title role in Mani Ratnam's Roja (1992) made her very popular. She made her comeback in 2008, in the Hindi-language film, Kabhi Socha Bhi Na Tha, and has been appearing in supporting roles in films since then. She has acted in 5 films with her real name Madhu. She made a comeback to the Tamil screen with Balaji Mohan's Tamil-Malayalam bilingual Vaayai Moodi Pesavum / Samsaaram Aarogyathinu Haanikaram in 2014. She has been hosting the DD National music television series Rangoli since August 2019.

Besides it, she has worked in television series such as Kaveri, Devi, Soundaravalli and Aarambh: Kahaani Devsena Ki. She has also appeared as a guest judge at some reality shows.

Personal life
She married Anand Shah on 19 February 1999  whom she met during a photoshoot. They have two daughters Ameyaa and Keia. Madhoo's husband is the cousin of Jay Mehta, who is married to actress Juhi Chawla.

Filmography

Feature films

Television series

References

External links
 
 

1969 births
Living people
Tamil actresses
Indian film actresses
Actresses in Hindi cinema
Actresses in Kannada cinema
Actresses in Malayalam cinema
Actresses in Tamil cinema
Tamil Nadu State Film Awards winners
20th-century Indian actresses
21st-century Indian actresses
Actors from Mumbai